Wilkow is a surname. Notable people with the surname include:
 Andrew Wilkow (born 1972), American radio broadcast host
 Jordan Wilkow, American band keyboardist
 Michael Wilkow (1932-2007), pseudonym for German author Rolf Kalmuczak

See also 
 Wilków geographical locations disambiguation page